Roll 'Em Bags is an album by American jazz vibraphonist Milt Jackson featuring performances recorded in 1949 and 1956 and released on the Savoy label.

Reception
The Allmusic review by Jim Todd states: "Although not commonly viewed as a hard bop pioneer, the urbane, bluesy structures that distinguish Jackson's writing at this time, arguably, make him a trailblazer for the movement."

Track listing
All compositions by Milt Jackson, except as indicated
 "Conglomeration" – 2:52 
 "Bruz" – 2:50 
 "You Go to My Head" (J. Fred Coots, Haven Gillespie) – 2:55 
 "Roll 'Em Bags" – 2:39 
 "Faultless – 2:35 
 "Hey, Frenchy" (Ozzie Cadena) – 2:35 
 "Come Rain or Come Shine" (Harold Arlen, Johnny Mercer) – 5:38 
 "Fred's Mood" – 6:26 
 "Wild Man" – 5:40 
Recorded in New York City on January 25, 1949 (tracks 1–6) and Van Gelder Studio, NJ on January 5, 1956 (tracks 7–9)

Personnel
Milt Jackson – vibes, piano
Kenny Dorham – trumpet  (tracks 1–6)
Julius Watkins – French horn (tracks 1–6)
Billy Mitchell (tracks 1–6), Lucky Thompson (tracks 7–9) – tenor saxophone   
Wade Legge – piano (tracks 7–9)
Wendell Marshall (tracks 7–9) Curly Russell (tracks 1–6) – bass
Kenny Clarke – drums
Joe Harris – timbales (tracks 1–6)

References 

Savoy Records albums
Milt Jackson albums
1956 albums
Albums recorded at Van Gelder Studio
Albums produced by Ozzie Cadena